Lee Yu-bi (born November 22, 1990) is a South Korean actress.

Early life
Yu-bi is the daughter of the actors Kyeon Mi-ri and Im Young-gyu. Her parents divorced in 1993. When her mother remarried in 1998 their stepfather, Lee Hong-heon legally adopted her and her sister, Lee Da-in who is also an actress. Lee changed her real name, Lee Yu-bi to Lee So-yul, but she did not change her stage name.

Career
She began her career in the 2011 sitcom Vampire Idol, then played supporting roles in television dramas The Innocent Man (2012), Gu Family Book (2013), and Pinocchio (2014), as well as the films The Royal Tailor (2014) and Twenty (2015). 
Lee plays her first leading role in Scholar Who Walks the Night, adapted from the webtoon about a Joseon vampire scholar and a cross-dressing bookseller.

In 2017, Lee starred alongside Choi Min-ho in the JTBC web drama Somehow 18. In October 2017, Lee signed with new management agency 935 Entertainment.

In 2018, Lee starred in the medical slice-of-life drama, A Poem a Day.

Filmography

Film

Television series

Web series

Television shows

Music video

Awards and nominations

References

External links

 
 
 

1990 births
Living people
South Korean film actresses
South Korean television actresses
Ewha Womans University alumni
IHQ (company) artists
Actresses from Seoul
South Korean female models